The Temple and the Lodge is a book written by Michael Baigent and Richard Leigh, in which the authors claim to trace a link between the suppressed Knights Templar and modern day Freemasonry.

Synopsis
The thesis of the book is that after the Knights Templar were suppressed for heresy at the behest of the King of France some elements found refuge in Scotland where they helped the Scots in their fight for independence from the English and the Templar Order survived through Jacobite Freemasonry to Strict Observance and the Grand Orient of France.

It also claims that many of the people behind the American Revolution were Freemasons, as were some of the less successful British commanders such as Howe and Cornwallis, who they claim intentionally lost (or tried to win by the path of least resistance) some of the battles to prevent the destruction of America's economic base.

Release
It was originally published in London by Jonathan Cape in 1988.  The first U.S. printing was by Arcade Publishing in New York in 1989.

References

1988 non-fiction books
Books by Michael Baigent
Books by Richard Leigh (author)
Jonathan Cape books
Collaborative non-fiction books